I Think About You is the fourth studio album by American country music artist Collin Raye. Released in 1995 on Epic Records, I Think About You was also Raye's fourth consecutive album to receive a platinum certification by the RIAA. The album produced the singles "I Think About You", "Not That Different", "On the Verge", "One Boy, One Girl", "Love Remains" and "What If Jesus Comes Back Like That". These latter two tracks were the first two singles of Raye's career to miss the Top Ten on the Billboard country charts since his 1991 debut single, "All I Can Be (Is a Sweet Memory)".

Track listing

Personnel
Adapted from liner notes.

Larry Byrom - electric guitar (all tracks except 4)
Joe Chemay - bass guitar (all tracks), background vocals (track 11)
Dan Dugmore - steel guitar (tracks 4, 9)
Larry Franklin - fiddle (tracks 5, 7, 8)
Paul Franklin - steel guitar (all tracks except 9)
John Hobbs - accordion (track 6), Hammond B-3 organ (tracks 1, 7, 11), piano (all tracks), synthesizer (tracks 2-4, 6, 7, 10, 11)
Dann Huff - electric guitar (tracks 2, 4, 7, 10)
Paul Leim - drums (all tracks except 4 & 9)
Anthony Martin - background vocals (track 10)
Collin Raye - lead vocals (all tracks)
Tom Roady - percussion (tracks 3, 8)
John Wesley Ryles - background vocals (tracks 4, 6, 9)
Ed Seay - six-string bass guitar (track 4)
Billy Joe Walker Jr. - acoustic guitar (tracks 2, 4, 6-8, 10, 11), electric guitar (tracks 1, 3, 5, 9)
Biff Watson - acoustic guitar (all tracks)
Dennis Wilson - background vocals (all tracks except 11)
Lonnie Wilson - drums (tracks 4, 9)
Curtis Young - background vocals (tracks 1-3, 5, 7, 8)

Charts

Weekly charts

Year-end charts

References

1995 albums
Albums produced by Paul Worley
Epic Records albums
Collin Raye albums